The 1890 United States House of Representatives elections in South Carolina were held on November 4, 1890 to select seven Representatives for two-year terms from the state of South Carolina.  Two Democratic incumbents were re-elected, one Republican incumbent was defeated, and the four open seats were retained by the Democrats.  The composition of the state delegation after the election was solely Democratic.

1st congressional district
Incumbent Democratic Congressman Samuel Dibble of the 1st congressional district, in office since 1883, declined to seek re-election.  William H. Brawley was nominated by the Democrats and he defeated Republican challenger William D. Crum in the general election.

General election results

|-
| 
| colspan=5 |Democratic hold
|-

2nd congressional district
Incumbent Democratic Congressman George D. Tillman of the 2nd congressional district, in office since 1883, defeated Republican challenger Seymour E. Smith.

General election results

|-
| 
| colspan=5 |Democratic hold
|-

3rd congressional district
Incumbent Democratic Congressman James S. Cothran of the 3rd congressional district, in office since 1887, declined to seek re-election.  George Johnstone won the Democratic primary and defeated Republican John R. Tolbert in the general election.

Democratic primary

General election results

|-
| 
| colspan=5 |Democratic hold
|-

4th congressional district
Incumbent Democratic Congressman William H. Perry of the 4th congressional district, in office since 1885, declined to seek re-election.  George W. Shell won the Democratic primary and defeated Republican J.F. Ensor in the general election.

Democratic primary

General election results

|-
| 
| colspan=5 |Democratic hold
|-

5th congressional district
Incumbent Democratic Congressman John J. Hemphill of the 5th congressional district, in office since 1883, defeated Republican challenger G.G. Alexander.

General election results

|-
| 
| colspan=5 |Democratic hold
|-

6th congressional district
Incumbent Democratic Congressman George W. Dargan of the 6th congressional district, in office since 1883, declined to seek re-election.  Eli T. Stackhouse was nominated by the Democrats and defeated Republican challenger Edmund H. Deas.

General election results

|-
| 
| colspan=5 |Democratic hold
|-

7th congressional district
Incumbent Republican Congressman Thomas E. Miller of the 7th congressional district, in office since 1890, was defeated by Democratic challenger William Elliott.

General election results

|-
| bgcolor="#FF3333" |
| Independent Republican
| E.M. Brayton
| align="right" | 1,410
| align="right" | 16.5
| align="right" | +16.5
|-

|-
| 
| colspan=5 |Democratic gain from Republican
|-

See also
United States House of Representatives elections, 1890
South Carolina gubernatorial election, 1890
South Carolina's congressional districts

References

"Supplemental Report of the Secretary of State to the General Assembly of South Carolina." Reports and Resolutions of the General Assembly of the State of South Carolina at the Regular Session Commencing November 25, 1890. Volume I. Columbia, SC: James H. Woodrow, 1891, pp. 609–612.

South Carolina
1890
1890 South Carolina elections